Xinghua Subdistrict is a subdistrict of Manzhouli, Inner Mongolia, China. , it has three residential communities (社区) under its administration.

See also
List of township-level divisions of Inner Mongolia

References

Township-level divisions of Inner Mongolia